El Salvador Practical Shooting Association, Spanish Asociacion Salvadoreña de Tiro Práctico, is the Salvadoran association for practical shooting under the International Practical Shooting Confederation.

References

External links 
 Official homepage of El Salvador Practical Shooting Association

Regions of the International Practical Shooting Confederation
Sports organizations of El Salvador